The synagogue in Sharhorod  in Ukraine, Vinnytsia Oblast was built in 1589 and is one of the oldest synagogues in Ukraine.

Architecture 
The synagogue was built in 1589 as a fortress synagogue with walls between 1 and 2 m thick. The square main hall, which measures 15 x 15 m was the prayer hall the men. To the north is an extension which was the prayer hall for women. There are further extensions along the walls, of which the ones to the south and east are fairly modern (around 1950).  Inside the main hall are 4 pillars, which are decorated with ornamental stucco fragments of the 18th and 19th centuries.

History 
Sharhorod was occupied by the Turks between 1674 and 1699. During this time the synagogue was used as a mosque. After the Turks were driven out of the region, it was converted into a synagogue again.

From around 1930, when Ukraine (and Sharhorod) belonged to the Soviet Union, the building was used as a storehouse for beverages.

In 2012 it was returned to the small Jewish community of Sharhorod.

See also 
 List of synagogues in Ukraine

References 

Synagogues in Ukraine
Fortress synagogues